Elli Alexiou (sometimes Ellē; – 1986) was a Greek author, playwright and journalist.

The daughter of a printer and publisher, Alexiou was born in Heraklion, Crete. She taught French in a high school, and was politically active, joining the Communist Party in 1928 and working with the National Liberation Front resistance during World War II. After the war, she received a scholarship from the French government and studied in Paris. She was stripped of Greek citizenship in 1950, living as an exile until it was restored in 1965.

Alexiou wrote short stories and novels about her experience as a school teacher and her life as a political exile in Hungary and Romania.  Her sister Galatea was the first wife of novelist Nikos Kazantzakis.

Works
Third Christian Girls School (1934)
Lumpen (1940)
Tributaries (1956)
Bent on Greatness (1966)
The Dominant (1972)
Demolished Mansions (1977)
Royal Oak (1983)

References

1890s births
1988 deaths
Writers from Heraklion
People from Ottoman Crete
Greek women novelists
Greek women short story writers
Greek short story writers
Greek women journalists
Women dramatists and playwrights
20th-century Greek women writers
20th-century Greek dramatists and playwrights
National Liberation Front (Greece) members
Greek exiles
20th-century Greek novelists
Greek emigrants to France
20th-century short story writers